Tamás Tóth (born 29 May 1989) is a Hungarian professional triathlete.

On 30 October 2018, the ITU (International Triathlon Union) announced a newly elected Athletes’ Committee which included five men and five women from eight different countries, Tamás Tóth was one of the elected members. Shortly thereafter, Tamás Tóth was elected as the Chair of the ITU Athletes’ Committee. Amongst other responsibilities, the ITU Athletes’ Committee carries on important work in support of upcoming Olympics games.

As of January 2021 Tamás Tóth had accomplished 114 starts, 7 Podiums, 3 Wins, had a World Ranking of 76 and a Continental ranking of 43.

During the 2016 Summer Olympic Games men's triathlon, Tamás placed 33rd and his fellow Hungarian countrymen Gabor Faldum placed 20th. In 2021, he competed in the men's triathlon at the 2020 Summer Olympics held in Tokyo, Japan.

Among the male Hungarian elite triathletes of the year 2010, Tóth was number 6 in the Ranglista.
Like Zsófia Tóth, he was supported by the National High Performance Scheme, Héraklész.

He lives in Budapest and runs for Budaörsi Triatlon Klub Egyesület.

ITU competitions 
The following list is based upon the official ITU rankings and the ITU Athletes' Profile Page.
Unless indicated otherwise, the following events are triathlons (Olympic Distance) and refer to the Elite category.

DNF = did not finish · DNS = did not start

References

External links 
 Hungarian Triathlon Federation 
 
 
 
 

1989 births
Living people
Hungarian male triathletes
Olympic triathletes of Hungary
Triathletes at the 2016 Summer Olympics
Triathletes at the 2020 Summer Olympics
20th-century Hungarian people
21st-century Hungarian people